Asia is an unincorporated community in Polk County, Texas, United States.

The community is located north of U.S. Route 287 and is two miles west of Corrigan, Texas. James Standley, who was a Mexican–American War veteran, founded the community, in 1859.

Notes

Unincorporated communities in Polk County, Texas
Unincorporated communities in Texas